Cheshire East Council is the local authority of the Borough of Cheshire East, Cheshire, England. It is a unitary authority, having the powers of a non-metropolitan county and district council combined. It provides a full range of local government services including Council Tax billing, libraries, social services, processing planning applications, waste collection and disposal, and it is a local education authority. The council was first elected on 1 May 2008, a year before coming into its powers on 1 April 2009. After an election in May 2019, no party holds overall control. The civil parish of Sandbach hosts the administrative headquarters for the council.

Powers and functions
The local authority derives its powers and functions from the Local Government Act 1972 and subsequent legislation. For the purposes of local government, Cheshire East is within a non-metropolitan area of England. As a unitary authority, Cheshire East Council has the powers and functions of both a non-metropolitan county and district council combined. In its capacity as a district council it is a billing authority collecting Council Tax and business rates, it processes local planning applications, it is responsible for housing, waste collection and environmental health. In its capacity as a county council it is a local education authority, responsible for social services, libraries and waste disposal.

Political control

Until May 2019 the council was controlled by the Conservatives. At the 2019 elections the council was left under no overall control. On 22 May 2019, the newly elected councillors met for the first time and elected Labour's Sam Corcoran as leader, after the party came to an agreement with independent councillors.

Premises
The council's main administrative offices are at Westfields on Middlewich Road in Sandbach. The building was opened in 2008 as the headquarters of the former Congleton Borough Council, one of Cheshire East's predecessors. Council and committee meetings are held at various venues across the borough, including Crewe Municipal Buildings, Macclesfield Town Hall, and Sandbach Town Hall.

Police investigations 
Cheshire East Council has been the subject of a number of police investigations.  At one point there were seven investigations, four of which are outlined below:

 Investigation into (former) Leader of the Council (Michael Jones) illegally awarding a contract to a friend (Amanda Moris of Core Fit) – launched 2015, dropped 2020 because of lack of evidence
 Investigation into a grant to Berkeley Academy in Wistaston for £70,000 awarded outside of contract rules – dropped because of insufficient evidence
 An investigation into allegations of manipulation of air pollution data – dropped
 Land transfer for the ANSA Waste Management Facility in Middlewich – dropped.

References

Leader and cabinet executives
Unitary authority councils of England
Local education authorities in England
Local authorities in Cheshire
Billing authorities in England
2009 establishments in England
Borough of Cheshire East